The 2017 World Wushu Championships was the 14th edition of the World Wushu Championships. It was held at the Kazan Gymnastics Center in Kazan, Russia from September 19 to October 3, 2017. For the countries in Asia, this was also the qualification for the 2018 Asian Games.

Medal summary

Medal table

Men's taolu

Men's sanda

Women's taolu

Women's sanda

References

External links 

 Official website (Archived)
 Official footage on YouTube by the International Wushu Federation



World Wushu Championships
Wushu Championships
2017 in Russian sport
2017 in wushu (sport)